China participated in the 2010 Summer Youth Olympics in Singapore. The Chinese Team consisted of 68 athletes competing in 19 sports.

At the closing ceremony, a Chinese segment was showed as Nanjing was the next host city of the youth games which was held in 2014.

Medalists

Archery

Boys

Girls

Mixed Team

Athletics

Boys
Track and Road Events

Field Events

Girls
Track and Road Events

Field Events

Badminton

Boys

Girls

Basketball

Girls

Canoeing

Boys

Girls

Diving

Boys

Girls

Equestrian

Fencing

Group Stage

Knock-Out Stage

Gymnastics

Artistic Gymnastics

Boys

Girls

Rhythmic Gymnastics 

Individual

Trampoline

Modern pentathlon

Rowing

Sailing

One Person Dinghy

Shooting

Pistol

Rifle

Swimming

Boys

Girls

Mixed

 * raced in heats only

Table tennis

Individual

Team

Taekwondo

Tennis

Singles

Doubles

Triathlon

Girls

Men's

Mixed

Weightlifting

Wrestling

Freestyle

References

External links

2010 in Chinese sport
Nations at the 2010 Summer Youth Olympics
China at the Youth Olympics